Abdul Karim Ressang (born 15 November 1955) is a former freestyle swimmer from the Netherlands. He competed at the 1976 Summer Olympics in the 200 m backstroke and 4 × 200 m freestyle relay and finished in sixth place in the relay.

He won a national title in the 100 m freestyle in 1975 and set about 15 national records in backstroke, freestyle and medley events between 1974 and 1976.

References

1955 births
Living people
Dutch male backstroke swimmers
Dutch male freestyle swimmers
Male medley swimmers
Swimmers at the 1976 Summer Olympics
Olympic swimmers of the Netherlands
Sportspeople from Utrecht (city)
20th-century Dutch people